Syncopacma albipalpella is a moth of the family Gelechiidae. It is found from Germany to Spain and Italy and from Great Britain to Austria.

The wingspan is 9–11 mm. Adults are on wing in July.

The larvae feed on Lotus corniculatus, Lotus uliginosus, Medicago and Trifolium species.

References

Moths described in 1854
Syncopacma
Moths of Europe